The Battle of Andong was a fight between North Korean and South Korean units in late July 1950. It was an early maneuver of the Korean War.

The Korean People's Army (KPA) 12th Infantry Division attempted to advance through Andong on its way south to Pusan, but was opposed by the Republic of Korea Army (ROK) 8th and Capital Division. The ensuing battle destroyed much of both the ROK 8th and KPA 12th Divisions, but the 12th suffered the heaviest damage; air attacks killed 600 from the division, 11 of the division's 30 T34-85 tanks were destroyed, and the division commander had been killed. The 12th Division, exhausted, had to cease its advance.

References

Sources

Battles and operations of the Korean War in 1950 
Battles of the Korean War involving South Korea 
Battles of the Korean War involving North Korea 
Andong 1950
History of North Gyeongsang Province
1950 in South Korea
July 1950 events in Asia